The Wyoming batholith is a granite batholith of Neoarchean origin —which forms the eroded core of the Granite and Laramie Mountains in central Wyoming. The Wyoming batholith lies within the Wyoming Craton. The batholith, in its time, was a magma chamber. Contemporary magma chambers are filled with lava and buried deeply and are inaccessible. The Wyoming batholith is accessible for study, its overburden having eroded away.

References

Batholiths of North America
Geologic formations of Wyoming
Neoarchean magmatism
Igneous petrology of Wyoming
Granite formations